Francis M. Gerstle (September 27, 1915 – February 23, 1970) was an American character actor who appeared in supporting roles in numerous films, radio programs and TV shows following World War II.

Biography 
Gerstle's notable appearances included Outside the Wall.  In television, he appeared in The George Burns and Gracie Allen Show in the episode Surprise Birthday Party, he portrayed Dick Gird in 6 episodes of The Life and Legend of Wyatt Earp.  He portrayed a highway patrolman on Highway Patrol, in an episode known as Father Thief.  His final appearance was in the episode San Francisco International in San Francisco International Airport which aired on September 29, 1970.

Death
Gerstle died of cancer in Santa Monica on February 23, 1970, at age 54.

Filmography

Film

D.O.A. (1949) - Dr. MacDonald
Outside the Wall (1950) - Stick-Up Man (uncredited)
My Friend Irma Goes West (1950) - Doctor (uncredited)
The Next Voice You Hear... (1950) - Plant Worker in Locker Room (uncredited)
A Life of Her Own (1950) - Birthday Party Guest (uncredited)
Three Guys Named Mike (1951) - Joe Allison - Radio Dispatcher (uncredited)
I Was a Communist for the FBI (1951) - Tom Cvetic (uncredited)
Strictly Dishonorable (1951) - Charlie - Dempsey's Photographer (uncredited)
Little Egypt (1951) - Globe Reporter (uncredited)
You Can Never Tell (1951) - Detective
The Blue Veil (1951) - Doctor (uncredited)
The Unknown Man (1951) - News Photographer in Bucknor's Office (uncredited)
Young Man with Ideas (1952) - Bill Collector (uncredited)
Blackhawk: Fearless Champion of Freedom (1952, Serial) - Dawson - New Fuel Demonstrator [Chs. 7-8] (uncredited)
The Bad and the Beautiful (1952) - Gabby Agent at Party (uncredited)
Above and Beyond (1952) - SSgt. Wilson (uncredited)
The Magnetic Monster (1953) - Col. Willis
Call Me Madam (1953) - Newspaper Reporter (uncredited)
The Lady Wants Mink (1953) - Frank - Office Worker (uncredited)
The Glory Brigade (1953) - Maj. Sauer (uncredited)
The Neanderthal Man (1953) - Mr. Wheeler - Hunter
Vicki (1953) - Detective (uncredited)
Killers from Space (1954) - Dr. Curt Kruger
The Long, Long Trailer (1954) - Gas Station Attendant (uncredited)
Drum Beat (1954) - Grant's Officer (uncredited)
Tight Spot (1955) - Jim Hornsby (uncredited)
I Cover the Underworld (1955) - Dum-Dum Wilson
5 Against the House (1955) - Robbery Suspect (uncredited)
It's Always Fair Weather (1955) - Mug (uncredited)
The McConnell Story (1955) - American Soldier in Korea (uncredited)
Slightly Scarlet (1956) - Detective Lt. Dave Dietz (uncredited)
The Killer Is Loose (1956) - Holdup Man (uncredited)
The Steel Jungle (1956) - Kadinski
The Proud Ones (1956) - Tim (uncredited)
Autumn Leaves (1956) - Ramsey
Magnificent Roughnecks (1956) - Chuck Evans
Between Heaven and Hell (1956) - Col. Miles (uncredited)
Top Secret Affair (1957) - Sgt. Kruger
The River's Edge (1957) - Harry Castleton
Under Fire (1957) - Col. Dundee
No Down Payment (1957) - Verdun (uncredited)
Ambush at Cimarron Pass (1958) - Capt. Sam Prescott
Onionhead (1958) - Officer at Inquiry (uncredited)
Submarine Seahawk (1958) - Capt. Boardman
I Mobster (1959) - District Attorney
Inside the Mafia (1959) - Julie - the killer
The Wasp Woman (1959) - Les Hellman
The Four Skulls of Jonathan Drake (1959) - Lee Coulter
Beloved Infidel (1959) - Frank - Reporter (uncredited)
Vice Raid (1959) - Capt. William Brennan
Hell to Eternity (1960) - Drunken Officer (uncredited)
A Thunder of Drums (1961) - Trooper Drortmander (uncredited)
The Nun and the Sergeant (1962) - Sergeant in Charge of the Brig
13 West Street (1962) - Mr. Johnson
Kid Galahad (1962) - Romero's Manager (uncredited)
Shock Corridor (1963) - Lt. Kane
Monstrosity (1963) - Dr. Frank
The Quick Gun (1964) - George Keely
Young Dillinger (1965) - Watchman
Marriage on the Rocks (1965) - Assistant (uncredited)
The Silencers (1966) - Frazer
The Wild Angels (1966) - Hospital Policeman
Murderers' Row (1966) - Furnas (uncredited)
Hell on Wheels (1967) - Ben
If He Hollers, Let Him Go! (1968) - Sergeant
Bullitt (1968) - (voice, uncredited)
The Bamboo Saucer (1968) - Technician at Radio (uncredited)
The Christine Jorgensen Story (1970) - Newspaper Reporter at Airport

Television

The George Burns and Gracie Allen Show (1951-1955, 3 episodes) - Charlie Hawthorne / Sgt. McDuff
Dick Tracy (1952, 1 episode) - Influence
Dangerous Assignment (1952, 1 episode)
Racket Squad (1952, 1 episode)
Dragnet (1952-1958, 8 episodes) - Jake / Harry Talmadge
Big Town (1953, 2 episode) - Duke Barker
I Married Joan (1953, 2 episodes) - Dr. Griswald / Tom
Four Star Playhouse (1953-1954, 2 episodes) - Mr. Braun / Tender
I Love Lucy (1953-1956, 2 episodes) - Helicopter Pilot / Short Indian
Our Miss Brooks (1954, 1 episode) - Jailor
The Pepsi-Cola Playhouse (1954, 1 episode) - George Harper
The Whistler (1954, 1 episode) - Max Fenner
The Adventures of Kit Carson (1954, 2 episodes)
Schlitz Playhouse of Stars''' (1954-1956, 3 episodes) - Joe Garson / Corp. Williams / Frank PierceGeneral Electric Theater (1954–1962, 2 episodes) - Dan Farrol / HugoTreasury Men in Action (1955, 1 episode) - Det. Sgt. DraperThe Man Behind the Badge (1955, 1 episode) - BernieStar Stage (1955, 1 episode)Highway Patrol (1955, 1 episode) - Sgt. BettsScience Fiction Theatre (1954-1956, 2 episodes) - Joe Garson / Corp. Williams / Frank PierceAlfred Hitchcock Presents (1955-1958, 3 episodes) - Police Chief Walt Haney / Police Sgt. Thompson / Police Sgt. MackDisneyland (1955-1958, 2 episodes) - George McShane / Rocket Ship CrewAdventures of Falcon (1956, 1 episode) - Mike PogginCrusader (1956, 1 episode) - Ben KelderCavalcade of America (1956, 1 episode) - Brig. Gen. N. D. CotaCrossroads (1956, 2 episodes) - Tito KrackowThe Adventures of Dr. Fu Manchu (1956, 1 episode) - Ivan ThorStudio 57 (1956-1957, 1 episode) - MarshalOn Trial (1955-1957, 2 episodes) - Vinnie / WilliamsThe Life and Legend of Wyatt Earp (1956-1960, 8 episodes) - Dick Gurd / Ganly /  Whitey RuppJeff's Collie aka Lassie (1956-1967, 2 episodes) - Ken HubbardThe New Adventures of Charlie Chan (1957, 1 episode) - Lieutenant StutzWhirlybirds (1957, 1 episode) - Capt. BrownJane Wyman Presents the Fireside Theatre (1956-1957, 3 episodes)Telephone Time (1957, 1 episode) - PierreThe Silent Service (1957, 1 episode) - First Squailfish CaptainCode 3 (1957, 1 episode) - Lt. Carl HarrisonThe Californians (1957) - 1 episodeThe Millionaire (1957-1959, 3 episodes) - Ross Marshall / Sergeant / Capt. WylieNavy Log (1958, 1 episode) - Commander ThompsonMan Without a Gun (1958, 1 episode)Alcoa Theatre (1958, 1 episode) - ColonelJefferson Drum (1958, 1 episode) - HardySteve Canyon (1958, 1 episode) - Gen. HallDeath Valley Days (1958, 2 episodes) - Sam Walton / Charlie ParkhurstSugarfoot (1958, 1 episode) - BartenderRescue 8 (1958,1 episode) - Building InspectorTales of Wells Fargo (1958-1962, 2 episodes) - Tim / John CurtisWagon Train (1958-1962) - 3 episodesMike Hammer (1959) - 1 episodeThe Fat Man: The Thirty Two Friends of Gina Lardelli (1959) - TV movieCimarron City (1959) - 1 episodeBehind Closed Doors (1959) - 1 episodeThe Third Man (1959, 1 episode) - Capt. GallifaRichard Diamond, Private Detective (1959, 1 episode) - LieutenantTombstone Territory (1959, 1 episode) - Deputy Marshal BledsoeHave Gun - Will Travel (1959, 1 episode) - BartenderLeave It to Beaver (1959, 1 episode) - Police SergeantThe Man and the Challenge (1959, 1 episode) - Ed BurkeU.S. Marshal (1959, 1 episode) - MaxThe Untouchables (1959-1960, 2 episodes) - Police Captain / Schultz ManPeter Gunn (1959-1961, 2 episodes) - Frank Clanton / Jake LynchBat Masterson (1960, 1 episode) - SheriffGoodyear Theatre (1960, 1 episode) - Pat HarrisTightrope (1960, 1 episode) - CharlieColt .45 (1960, 1 episode) - Ed GarrickHawaiian Eye (1960, 1 episode) - Major DunhamBourbon Street Beat (1960, 1 episode) - Sgt. Steve TravisThe Andy Griffith Show (1960, 1 episode) - DereksonLock-Up (1960, 1 episode) - Johnny GibsonThe June Allyson Show (1960, 1 episode) - JudgeDan Raven (1960, 1 episode) - Harrow77 Sunset Strip (1960-1961, 3 episodes) - Capt. Devon / John Carter / Bennie CannonThe Jack Benny Program (1960-1963, 4 episodes) - Sound Man / Deli clerk / Larry Hawkins / Lockup PolicemanWanted: Dead or Alive (1961) - 1 episodeCheckmate (1961) - 1 episodeThe Case of the Dangerous Robin (1961) - 1 episodeLawman (1961) - 1 episodeThe Americans (1961) - 1 episodeThe Best of the Post (1961, 1 episode) - SteveAngel (1961, 1 episode: The Wedding) - Mr. Butler The McGonigle (1961, TV Movie) - Capt. AmboyCheyenne (1961, 1 episode) - HammondThe Everglades (1961, 1 episode) - RafeShotgun Slade (1961, 1 episode)Laramie (1961, 1963, 2 episodes) - Judge Wheeler / Sheriff AikensPerry Mason (1961-1964, 3 episodes) - Sgt. Steve Toland / Det. Steve Toland / Allen87th Precinct (1962, 1 episode) - Ed BennettBonanza (1962-1967, 2 episodes) - Strand / Jake WeberG.E. True (1963, 1 episode) - William J. BurnsGlynis (1963, 1 episode) - MannyMcHale's Navy (1963-1965, 2 episodes) - Capt. Cummings / Capt. DawsonChanning (1964, 1 episode) - PolicemanVacation Playhouse (1964, 1 episode)The Donna Reed Show (1965, 1 episode)Mr. Novak (1965, 1 episode) - AdamsThe Virginian (1965-1966, 2 episodes) - Milt Shiffman / Clint KoskiBranded (1966, 1 episode) - Maj. MeadeLaredo (1966, 1 episode) - FarmerThe Loner (1966, 1 episode) - MinerThe Patty Duke Show (1966, 1 episode) - ManHoney West (1966, 1 episode) - DirectorThe Green Hornet (1966, 1 episode) - Mel HurkHogan's Heroes (1967, 1 episode) - Gen. Aloysius BartonDragnet (1967, 1 episode) - Albert MarksIronside (1967–1968, 2 episodes) - Buck Dennison / Eddie BurnsFantastic Four (1967–1968) - Blastaar (voice)Gomer Pyle, U.S.M.C. (1967, 1969, 2 episodes) - Plainclothes Man / DriverArabian Knights (1968) - (voice)The Banana Splits Adventure Hour (1968-1969, 8 episodes) - RaseemLancer (1969, 1 episode) - Lem CableMannix (1970, 1 episode) - Harry C. ArmitageSan Francisco International Airport (1970, 1 episode: San Francisco International) - Congressman (final appearance)

RadioEscape''

References

External links

1915 births
1970 deaths
American male radio actors
American male voice actors
American male television actors
Deaths from cancer in California
20th-century American male actors